Hebeloma cavipes is a species of mushroom in the family Hymenogastraceae.

Description
Pileus: 15–58 mm diameter, cap convex and sometimes umbonate, slightly viscid. Cap colour yellow brown to cinnamon to chestnut or even dark brick, sometimes with a pale but strongly coloured zone and finally pinkish buff to cream to almost white near de margin. Disc zonate. Pileus margin sometimes involute and slightly scalloped, but usually straight. Lamellae emarginated, spaced moderately; colour cream or brown when young, later sepia as spores mature; edge fimbriated and paler than lamellae; with droplets. Lamellules frequent. Stipe central, sometimes cylindrical but usually clavate and subbulbous; white to leather-tan, usually discoloring to brown with age. Stipe surface pruinose to floccose in the apex. Cortina not observed. Smell raphanoid with cocoa hints. Taste raphanoid to bitter. Spore deposit brownish olive to umber. Spores amygdaloid with a small apiculus. Size 9.2–11.7 × 5.5–6.6 μm.

References

cavipes
Fungi of Europe